The Molise regional election of 2006 took place on 5–6 November 2006.

Incumbent Michele Iorio (Forza Italia) defeated Roberto Ruta (The Daisy).

Results
Sources: Ministry of the Interior – Historical Archive of Elections

Elections in Molise
2006 elections in Italy
November 2006 events in Europe